Whitehouse is a village within the Toledo Metropolitan Area in Lucas County, Ohio, United States. The population was 4,149 at the 2010 census.

History
The area now known as the Village of Whitehouse was originally occupied by various Native American tribes, such as the Miami, Ottawa, Shawnee, Wyandot, and Delaware. Settlers of European descent began travelling through the Northwestern Territory after "Mad" Anthony Wayne's victory at the Battle of Fallen Timbers in 1794. Many settlers were of German or Dutch descent in search of farmland. Canal access also attracted many settlers to this particular area. A post office was established as Whitehouse in 1856. Whitehouse was platted in 1864. The village was named for Edward Whitehouse, a railroad official and treasurer of the Wabash Railroad.

Geography
Whitehouse is located at  (41.521102, -83.801208).

Demographics

2010 census
At the 2010 census, there were 4,149 people, 1,524 households, and 1,145 families living in the village. The racial makeup of the village was 96.4% White, 0.9% African American, 0.2% Native American, 0.6% Asian, 0.6% from other races, and 1.2% from two or more races. Hispanic or Latino of any race were 2.3% of the population.

Of the 1,524 households 38.6% had children under the age of 18 living with them, 61.2% were married couples living together, 9.7% had a female householder with no husband present, 4.3% had a male householder with no wife present, and 24.9% were non-families. 21.4% of households were one person and 9.3% were one person aged 65 or older. The average household size was 2.67 and the average family size was 3.11.

The median age in the village was 39 years. 27.9% of residents were under the age of 18; 6.1% were between the ages of 18 and 24; 24.6% were from 25 to 44; 29.6% were from 45 to 64; and 12% were 65 or older. The gender makeup of the village was 48.6% male and 51.4% female.

2000 census
As of the census of 2000, there were 2,733 people, 1,036 households, and 762 families living in the village. The population density was 791.2 people per square mile (305.9/km). There were 1,063 housing units at an average density of 307.7 per square mile (119.0/km). The racial makeup of the village was 98.46% White, 0.11% African American, 0.11% Native American, 0.26% Asian, 0.04% Pacific Islander, 0.62% from other races, and 0.40% from two or more races. Hispanic or Latino of any race were 1.21% of the population.

Of the 1,036 households 35.8% had children under the age of 18 living with them, 61.8% were married couples living together, 9.2% had a female householder with no husband present, and 26.4% were non-families. 23.4% of households were one person and 9.4% were one person aged 65 or older. The average household size was 2.59 and the average family size was 3.07.

The age distribution was 26.5% under the age of 18, 7.1% from 18 to 24, 26.7% from 25 to 44, 27.4% from 45 to 64, and 12.3% 65 or older. The median age was 40 years. For every 100 females there were 94.7 males. For every 100 females age 18 and over, there were 91.8 males.

The median household income was $52,037 and the median family income  was $66,050. Males had a median income of $43,438 versus $30,882 for females. The per capita income for the village was $22,964. About 2.1% of families and 2.6% of the population were below the poverty line, including 1.9% of those under age 18 and 8.2% of those age 65 or over.

Places of interest
 The Butterfly House
 Blue Creek Conservation Area
 Oak Openings Preserve Metropark
Veterans Memorial Park
Whitehouse Pythian Castle
 Whitehouse Village Park
 Wabash Cannonball Trail

References

External links
 more Whitehouse, Ohio info from Toledo.com
 Anthony Wayne Schools

Villages in Lucas County, Ohio
Villages in Ohio
1856 establishments in Ohio
Populated places established in 1856